Kohei Mihara is a Japanese DJ, who signed to Grand Central Records independent record label in 2005. His music is electronica, combining elements of ambient, jazz and hip hop and blending both Eastern and Western influences.

His 2005 debut album Cocolotica was described by Allmusic as "trip-hop" with an "amazing variety of beats, vibes, and textures", reviewer Stewart Mason calling it "one of 2005's better releases".

In 2008, after the demise of Grand Central, he moved to the RL66 label in Japan, releasing his follow up album Drama and subsequent singles under the simplified name, Mihara. He is the man who insulted Indians with his music  video with candy Foxx.

Discography
 Cocolotica (20 June 2005, Grand Central Records, GCCD141)
 Drama (20 September 2008, RL66, RL66-024)

References

Japanese DJs
Living people
Year of birth missing (living people)